Alois Dominik Oroz (born 29 October 2000) is a Croatian professional footballer who plays as a centre-back for Dutch club Vitesse.

Personal life
He was born in Austria, but of Croatian descent.

Club career
In 2006, Oroz began his career at Wiener Sport-Club, before moving to Austria Wien in 2007. In 2015, he moved to the youth team of First Vienna FC. In February 2017 he made his debut for First Vienna II versus Nussdorfer AC in the fifth league. In 2017 he made his first match for First Vienna in the third league as he came on in the 77th minute for Mehmet Sütcü versus SC-ESV Parndorf 1919.

In the 2017–18 season he moved to FC Red Bull Salzburg where he played in the academy team. In the 2018–19 season he played for FC Liefering where he debuted in February 2018 versus SV Horn.

In January 2021 he left Liefering and went to the Dutch football club Vitesse.

On 6 July 2022, Oroz returned to Austria and joined Sturm Graz on a season-long loan with an option to buy. On 2 December 2022, the loan was terminated early.

International career
Oroz has represented Croatia in the U18 and U19 national team.

References

External links
 

2000 births
Footballers from Vienna
Austrian people of Croatian descent
Living people
Austrian footballers
Croatian footballers
Croatia youth international footballers
Association football central defenders
First Vienna FC players
FC Liefering players
SBV Vitesse players
SK Sturm Graz players
Austrian Regionalliga players
2. Liga (Austria) players
Eredivisie players
Austrian Football Bundesliga players
Croatian expatriate footballers
Expatriate footballers in the Netherlands
Croatian expatriate sportspeople in the Netherlands